Selenium dichloride is the inorganic compound with the formula SeCl2.  It forms red-brown solutions in ethers.  Selenium dichloride has been prepared by treating gray selenium with sulfuryl chloride.  Adducts of selenium dichloride with thioethers and thioureas are well characterized. Related complexes of tellurium dichloride are known.  

Solutions of selenium dichloride are unstable at room temperature, forming selenium monochloride after several minutes at room temperature:
3 SeCl2  →  Se2Cl2  +  SeCl4

References

Selenium(II) compounds
Chlorides
Nonmetal halides
Chalcohalides